The Millers Tavern Rural Historic District encompasses a large rural landscape in western Essex County, Virginia, extending partly into eastern King and Queen County. Most of the farm properties in the district are modest, with vernacular building stock dating from the late 18th century to the mid-20th century. Sprinkled throughout the district are a few churches and grist mills, as well as the eponymous Miller's Tavern. The district is roughly bounded by U.S. Route 360 and Howerton, Dunbrooke, Latanes Mill, and Midway Rds.

The district was listed on the National Register of Historic Places in 2017.

See also
National Register of Historic Places listings in Essex County, Virginia
National Register of Historic Places listings in King and Queen County, Virginia

References

Historic districts on the National Register of Historic Places in Virginia
National Register of Historic Places in Essex County, Virginia
National Register of Historic Places in King and Queen County, Virginia